Kupera is located in Lainya County of Central Equatoria State, South Sudan.

Kupera was once a County in then Yei River State which exited between April 2016 to 2020 before  the 32 States were reverted to the original 10 States of South Sudan.

References 

Equatoria
Populated places in Central Equatoria